Watto is a fictional character in the Star Wars franchise, featured in the films The Phantom Menace and Attack of the Clones. He is computer-generated and is voiced by voice actor Andy Secombe. He is a mean-tempered, greedy Toydarian, and owner of a second-hand goods store in Mos Espa on the planet Tatooine. Among Watto's belongings are the slaves Shmi Skywalker and her son, Anakin. He acquires them after winning a podracing bet with Gardulla the Hutt, and he puts them both to work in his store. Anakin demonstrates an incredible aptitude for equipment repair, and Watto decides to profit from it by having the boy fix various broken equipment in the store. He eventually loses Anakin in a podracing bet with Qui-Gon Jinn when he bets on a competitor, Sebulba, who is defeated by Anakin.

Concept and creation
George Lucas was specific with the concept art team about what features he envisioned for Watto. Design director Doug Chiang described the character's design as "this conglomeration of odd things that really didn't fit, but that in the end gave him a very unique and powerful personality". Lucas dismissed concepts including a pudgy parrot by Terryl Whitlatch (though Whitlatch recalls one of her designs influencing the direction for the character) and a four-armed beast with a cigar by Iain Craig. Chiang repurposed the head from one of his early Neimoidian designs, featuring a hooked trunk and crooked teeth, and added hummingbird wings, meeting Lucas's approval. Additionally, Chiang gave Watto a vest and a tool belt, only asking for webbed feet and pants. Modeling supervisor Geoff Campell was skeptical of having a chubby alien with wings, so it was imagined that the Toydarians are filled with gas, with the wings propelling them instead of supporting their weight. Animation supervisor Rob Coleman realized that the alien's teeth would need some modification, as the craggy teeth made lip-syncing difficult. To solve the problem, Coleman broke off one of Watto's incisors, giving him a "corner-of-the-mouth" vernacular. His expressions were based on video footage of voice actor Andy Secombe, photographs of Coleman imitating the character, and modeler Steve Alpin saying Watto's lines to a mirror. Alec Guinness performing as Fagin in Oliver Twist was used as an influence in the character's development. The sound of his wings flapping is a looped recording of sound designer Ben Burtt opening and closing an umbrella.

Appearances
Watto first appears in Star Wars: Episode I – The Phantom Menace, the first title chronologically in the Star Wars series. He has both an ability for haggling and a resistance to the "Jedi mind trick", a technique used to persuade people. He is both a junk dealer and slave owner on the planet Tatooine, possessing both Shmi Skywalker and her son Anakin. When challenged to a bet for Anakin's freedom by Qui-Gon Jinn, Watto agrees. After Anakin beats Sebulba (whom Watto bets on), a competing racer that he challenged throughout the race he participated in, he was let go. However, Watto (who believes Qui-Gon cheated on him) considers calling off the bet, but gives in when Qui-Gon threatens to have him talk things over with the Hutt Clan. Watto makes a final appearance in the sequel Episode II – Attack of the Clones, which takes place 10 years after the original film, the now-adult Anakin returns to Tatooine to find his mother. Searching Mos Espa, he finds Watto sitting outside the shop at a small stall. They reunite on somewhat amicable terms and Watto tells Anakin that he sold Shmi some years ago to a moisture farmer named Cliegg Lars, who freed and married her. Watto then takes Anakin and Padmé to look through his records to find her.

Watto makes multiple further appearances in the Star Wars Expanded Universe; one such appearance details his time on his home planet before he came to Tatooine during a war. It also tells how he sustained his broken tusk and disabled leg. He later learns his business savvy from the Jawas, native to the planet Tatooine. In the non-canonical Star Wars comic book Star Wars: Visionaries, Watto is shown to have been killed by Darth Maul (whose appearance here predates the canonical revelation of his survival of the events of The Phantom Menace) during Maul's process of tracking down his nemesis Obi-Wan Kenobi, to gain vengeance for his defeat during the Battle of Naboo.

His son Blatto makes an appearance in the non-canonical television special Phineas and Ferb: Star Wars.

There has been an uncommon amount of Watto merchandise made over the years since 1999. In 2019, the Watto Funko Pop was first realized at the 2019 Galactic Con as an Exclusive. Watto has also been produced as a Lego figure and featured in the Lego Star Wars video games, in addition to numerous other appearances in the form of collectibles and other merchandising.

Reception
Editors for IGN ranked Watto 78th in their list of Top 100 Star Wars characters. They wrote that he was "one of the most confusing scientific anomalies" due to "the idea that a creature so potbellied is able to stay afloat for so long". They added that he was "no prince" for his unscrupulous deals.
In the book The Holy Family and Its Legacy, author Albrecht Koschorke discusses the presence of "The Holy Family" in The Phantom Menace, stating that while there was no "solicitous guardian watching over the mother and the holy child," Watto acts in a similar position as a "man who possesses patriarchal powers without being the father."

Allegations of antisemitism
It has been suggested that the character is offensive because of his perceived similarities to a stereotypical Jew, having a large hooked nose, beady eyes, unkempt facial hair, speaking in a gravelly voice, and being portrayed as greedy and covetous. J. Hoberman of The Village Voice called him "the most blatant ethnic stereotype" due to his hooked nose. Bruce Gottlieb of Slate magazine criticized him as well, comparing his character to the antisemitic notion that the Jewish race is "behind the slave trade". Patricia J. Williams of The Nation stated that Watto was also described as a stereotype of Arabs, but that he was "more comprehensively anti-Semitic—both anti-Arab and anti-Jew." She added that Watto reminded her of an "anti-Semitic caricature published in Vienna at the turn of the 20th century."

Jane Prettyman of the American Review noted that after leaving the theater, she heard two young boys describe him as "that weird little Jew guy with wings". Prettyman described his depiction as "not at all subtle", and said that "it can be counted on to flush out already-formed Jew-haters among young audiences and give them permission to continue their hatred out loud." Looking back on the character on the twentieth anniversary of the film, essayist Aaron Freedman both acknowledges the stereotypical aspects of the character while admitting that as a boy he empathized with Watto as "the only representation we Jews get in the Star Wars franchise," suggesting that the portrayal of Watto as struggling to survive in a society shaped by forces beyond his control echoed that of both Jews throughout history and the Shakespearean character Shylock.

Appearances in other media
Crazy Watto is a two-minute-long fan film that made its debut on the Internet in 2000. The film is a spoof of used car deal ads shown on television, featuring Watto. He offers up for sale familiar objects such as an X-wing. The film played at the 2005 Cannes Film Festival, and is a popular fan film at many science fiction conventions. The film was originally hosted by TheForce.Net, but is now part of The Official Star Wars Fan Film Awards on AtomFilms.

Actor Griffin Newman portrays a version of the character as the co-host on The George Lucas Talk Show, where he is the cantankerous, somewhat prankish sidekick to Connor Ratliff’s George Lucas. Newman has performed the character onstage and over numerous streaming performances, often clad in a tight blue rubber costume.

References

External links
 
 

Characters created by George Lucas
Fictional businesspeople
Fictional gamblers
Fictional junk dealers
Fictional shopkeepers
Fictional slave owners
Film characters introduced in 1999
Male characters in film
Race-related controversies in film
Star Wars animated characters
Star Wars Skywalker Saga characters